Faghiheh Soltani (Persian: فقیهه سلطانی) is an Iranian actress.

Biography 
Soltani was born in Hamedan in 1974, and studied drama at Islamic Azad University. She took acting lessons with Golab Adineh. She made her acting debut in 1995, appearing in the film The Blue Veiled by acclaimed director Rakhshan Bani-Etemad. Since then, she has appeared in many films and TV series. Among her notable films are Soorati (2003) by Fereydoun Jeyrani, Sunglasses (1999), and The Miracle of Laughter by Yadollah Samadi. She was nominated for the Crystal Simorgh for Best Actress for the latter role, but eventually lost to Golchehreh Sajadiye.

She is married to Iranian footballer Jalal Omidian.

References

External links
 

Iranian film actresses
Living people
1974 births
Iranian television actresses
20th-century Iranian actresses
21st-century Iranian actresses
People from Hamadan
Islamic Azad University alumni